Branch Lee Russell (October 9, 1895 – May 1, 1959) was an American Negro league outfielder in the 1920s and 1930s.

A native of South Boston, Virginia, Russell grew up in Winchester, Massachusetts, and attended Henderson Institute in Henderson, North Carolina. He served in the United States Army during World War I, advancing to the rank of corporal. Russell made his Negro leagues debut in 1922 for the Kansas City Monarchs. Known as "a good contact hitter", he went on to spend the majority of his career with the St. Louis Stars, where he played for 10 years, and served as manager for part of the 1926 season. Russell died in St. Louis, Missouri in 1959 at age 63.

References

External links
 and Seamheads

1895 births
1959 deaths
Kansas City Monarchs players
Negro league baseball managers
St. Louis Stars (baseball) players
20th-century African-American sportspeople
Baseball outfielders
United States Army personnel of World War I
United States Army non-commissioned officers
African Americans in World War I
African-American United States Army personnel